Üzümlü is a municipality (belde) and seat of Üzümlü District of Erzincan Province in Turkey. It had a population of 8,325 in 2021.

Sights
 Altıntepe fortress, an ancient Urartian site.

References

External links
Erzincan governor's official website - Üzümlü 

Populated places in Erzincan Province
Towns in Turkey